APOPT (for Advanced Process OPTimizer) is a software package for solving large-scale optimization problems of any of these forms:

 Linear programming (LP)
 Quadratic programming (QP)
 Quadratically constrained quadratic program (QCQP)
 Nonlinear programming (NLP)
 Mixed integer programming (MIP)
 Mixed integer linear programming (MILP)
 Mixed integer nonlinear programming (MINLP)

Applications of the APOPT include chemical reactors, 
friction stir welding, prevention of hydrate formation in deep-sea pipelines, computational biology, solid oxide fuel cells, and flight controls for Unmanned Aerial Vehicles (UAVs).

Benchmark Testing 

Standard benchmarks such as CUTEr and SBML curated models are used to test the performance of APOPT relative to solvers BPOPT, IPOPT, SNOPT, and MINOS. A combination of APOPT (Active Set SQP) and BPOPT (Interior Point Method) performed the best on 494 benchmark problems for solution speed and total fraction of problems solved.

See also 
 APOPT is supported in AMPL, APMonitor, Gekko, Julia, MATLAB, Pyomo, and Python.

References

External links 
 
 Web interface to solve optimization problems with the APOPT solver
 Download APOPT for AMPL, MATLAB, Julia, Python, or APMonitor

Numerical software
Mathematical optimization software